Paul Muldoon (born 20 June 1951) is an Irish poet. He has published more than thirty collections and won a Pulitzer Prize for Poetry and the T. S. Eliot Prize. At Princeton University he is currently both the Howard G. B. Clark '21 University Professor in the Humanities and Founding Chair of the Lewis Center for the Arts. He held the post of Oxford Professor of Poetry from 1999 to 2004 and has also served as president of the Poetry Society (UK) and Poetry Editor at The New Yorker.

Life and work
Muldoon was born, the eldest of three children, on a farm in County Armagh outside The Moy, near the boundary with County Tyrone, Northern Ireland. His father worked as a farmer (among other jobs) and his mother was a school-mistress. In 2001, Muldoon said of the Moy: It's a beautiful part of the world. It's still the place that's 'burned into the retina', and although I haven't been back there since I left for university 30 years ago, it's the place I consider to be my home. We were a fairly non-political household; my parents were nationalists, of course, but it was not something, as I recall, that was a major area of discussion. But there were patrols; an army presence; movements of troops; a sectarian divide. And that particular area was a nationalist enclave, while next door was the parish where the Orange Order was founded; we'd hear the drums on summer evenings. But I think my mother, in particular, may have tried to shelter us from it all. Besides, we didn't really socialise a great deal. We were 'blow-ins' – arrivistes – new to the area, and didn't have a lot of connections. Talking of his home life, he continues: "I'm astonished to think that, apart from some Catholic Truth Society pamphlets, some books on saints, there were, essentially, no books in the house, except one set, the Junior World Encyclopaedia, which I certainly read again and again. People would say, I suppose, that it might account for my interest in a wide range of arcane bits of information. At some level, I was self-educated." He was a '"Troubles poet" from the beginning.

In 1969, Muldoon read English at Queen's University Belfast, where he met Seamus Heaney and became close to the Belfast Group of poets which included Michael Longley, Ciarán Carson, Medbh McGuckian and Frank Ormsby. Muldoon said of the experience, "I think it was fairly significant, certainly to me. It was exciting. But then I was 19, 20 years old, and at university, so everything was exciting, really." Muldoon was not a strong student at Queen's. He recalls: "I had stopped. Really, I should have dropped out. I'd basically lost interest halfway through. Not because there weren't great people teaching me, but I'd stopped going to lectures, and rather than doing the decent thing, I just hung around". During his time at Queens, his first collection New Weather was published by Faber and Faber. He met his first wife, fellow student Anne-Marie Conway, and they were married after their graduation in 1973. Their marriage broke up in 1977.

For thirteen years (1973–86), Muldoon worked as an arts producer for the BBC in Belfast. In this time, which saw the most bitter period of the Troubles, he published the collections Why Brownlee Left (1980) and Quoof (1983). After leaving the BBC, he taught English and Creative Writing at the University of East Anglia and at Caius College and Fitzwilliam College, Cambridge, where his students included Lee Hall (Billy Elliot) and Giles Foden (Last King of Scotland). In 1987, Muldoon emigrated to the United States, where he has taught on the creative writing program at Princeton. He was Professor of Poetry at Oxford University for the five-year term 1999–2004, and is an Honorary Fellow of Hertford College, Oxford.

Muldoon is married to novelist Jean Hanff Korelitz, whom he met at an Arvon writing course. He has two children, Dorothy and Asher, and lives primarily in New York City.

Poetry and other works
His poetry is known for his difficult, sly, allusive style, casual use of obscure or archaic words, understated wit, punning, and deft technique in meter and slant rhyme. As Peter Davidson says in The New York Times review of books "Muldoon takes some honest-to-God reading. He's a riddler, enigmatic, distrustful of appearances, generous in allusion, doubtless a dab hand at crossword puzzles".  The Guardian cites him as being "among the few significant poets of our half-century"; "the most significant English-language poet born since the second world war" – a talent off the map. (Notably, Seamus Heaney was born in 1939.) Muldoon's work is often compared with Heaney, a fellow Northern Irish poet, friend and mentor to Muldoon. Heaney, who won the 1995 Nobel Prize in Literature, is slightly better known, sells widely and has enjoyed more popular success.

In 2003, Muldoon won the Pulitzer Prize for Poetry. He has been awarded fellowships in the Royal Society of Literature and the American Academy of Arts and Sciences; the 1994 T. S. Eliot Prize; the 1997 Irish Times Poetry Prize, and the 2003 Griffin International Prize for Excellence in Poetry. He was also shortlisted for the 2007 Poetry Now Award. Muldoon's poems have been collected into four books: Selected Poems 1968–1986 (1986), New Selected Poems: 1968–1994 (1996), Poems 1968–1998 (2001) and Selected Poems 1968–2014 (2016). In September 2007, he was hired as poetry editor of The New Yorker.

Most of Muldoon's collections contain shorter poems with an inclusion of a long concluding poem. As Muldoon produced more collections, the long poems gradually took up more space in the volume, until in 1990 the poem Madoc: A Mystery took over the volume of that name, leaving only seven short poems to appear before it. Muldoon has not since published a poem of comparable length, but a new trend is emerging whereby more than one long poem appears in a volume.

Madoc: A Mystery, exploring themes of colonisation, is among Muldoon's most difficult works. It includes, as "poetry", such non-literary constructions as maps and geometric diagrams. In the book Irish Poetry since 1950, John Goodby states it is "by common consent, the most complex poem in modern Irish literature [...]  – a massively ambitious, a historiographical metafiction". The post-modern poem narrates, in 233 sections (the same number as the number of Native American tribes), an alternative history in which Samuel Taylor Coleridge and Robert Southey come to America to found a utopian community. The two poets had, in reality, discussed but never undertaken this journey. Muldoon's poem is inspired by Southey's work Madoc, about a legendary Welsh prince of that name.  Critics are divided over the poem's success. Some are stunned by its scope and many others, such as John Banville, have professed themselves utterly baffled by it – feeling it to be wilfully obscure. Muldoon says of it: "I quite enjoy having fun. It's part of how it is, and who we are."

Muldoon has contributed the librettos for four operas by  Daron Hagen: Shining Brow (1992), Vera of Las Vegas (1996), Bandanna (1998), and The Antient Concert (2005). His interests have not only included libretto, but the rock lyric as well, penning lines for the band The Handsome Family as well as Warren Zevon whose title track "My Ride's Here" belongs to a Muldoon collaboration. Muldoon also writes lyrics for (and plays "rudimentary" rhythm guitar in) his own Princeton-based rock bands. Rackett (2004–2010) was disbanded in 2010. Another of Muldoon's bands, Wayside Shrines, has recorded and released thirteen of the lyrics included in Muldoon's collection of rock lyrics, Word on the Street. His current group is known as Rogue Oliphant.

Muldoon has also edited a number of anthologies, including The Lyrics: 1956 to the Present by Paul McCartney, published in 2021, written two children's books, translated the work of other authors, performed live at the Poetry Brothel. and published critical prose.

Awards
Muldoon has won the following major poetry awards:
 1990: Guggenheim Fellowship
 1992: Geoffrey Faber Memorial Prize for Madoc: A Mystery
 1994: T. S. Eliot Prize for The Annals of Chile
 1997: Irish Times Irish Literature Prize for Poetry for New Selected Poems 1968–1994
 2002: T. S. Eliot Prize (shortlist) for Moy Sand and Gravel
 2003: Griffin Poetry Prize (Canada) for Moy Sand and Gravel
 2003: Pulitzer Prize for Poetry for Moy Sand and Gravel
 2004: American Ireland Fund Literary Award
 2004: Aspen Prize for Poetry
 2004: Shakespeare Prize
 2009: John William Corrington Award for Literary Excellence
 2017: Queen's Gold Medal for Poetry

Selected honours
 Honorary Professor in the School of English at the University of St Andrews (Scotland)
 Professor of Poetry at Oxford University 1999–2004 (England)
 Honorary Fellow of Hertford College, Oxford University (England)
 Fellowship with the Royal Society of Literature (England)
 Fellowship with the American Academy of Arts and Sciences (US)
Awarded an honorary doctorate by Trinity College Dublin in 2014 (Ireland)

Bibliography

Poetry: Main Collections 
 New Weather (1973) Faber & Faber, London
 Mules (1977) Faber & Faber, London / Wake Forest University Press, Winston-Salem, N.C.
 Why Brownlee Left (1980) Faber & Faber, London / Wake Forest University Press, Winston-Salem, N.C.
 Quoof (1983) Faber & Faber, London / Wake Forest University Press, Winston-Salem, N.C.
 Meeting the British (1987) Faber & Faber, London / Wake Forest University Press, Winston-Salem, N.C.
 Madoc: A Mystery (1990) Faber & Faber, London / Farrar, Straus & Giroux, New York
 The Annals of Chile (1994) Faber & Faber, London / Farrar, Straus & Giroux, New York
 Hay (1998) Faber & Faber, London / Farrar, Straus & Giroux, New York
 Moy Sand and Gravel (2002) Faber & Faber, London / Farrar, Straus & Giroux, New York (Pulitzer Prize for Poetry and the Griffin Poetry Prize)
 Horse Latitudes (2006) Faber & Faber, London / Farrar, Straus & Giroux, New York (shortlisted for T. S. Eliot Prize)
 Maggot (2010) Faber & Faber, London / Farrar, Straus & Giroux, New York (shortlisted for 2011 Poetry Now Award)
 One Thousand Things Worth Knowing (2015) Faber & Faber, London / Farrar, Straus & Giroux, New York
 Frolic and Detour (2019) Faber & Faber, London / Farrar, Straus & Giroux, New York
 Howdie-Skelp (2021) Faber & Faber, London / Farrar, Straus & Giroux, New York

Poetry: Selected Editions
 Selected Poems 1968–1983 (1986) Faber & Faber, London
 Selected Poems 1968-1986 (1987) Ecco Press, New York
 New Selected Poems: 1968–1994 (1996) Faber & Faber, London
 Poems 1968–1998 (2001) Faber & Faber, London / Farrar, Straus & Giroux, New York
 Selected Poems 1968–2014 (2016) Faber & Faber, London / Farrar, Straus & Giroux, New York
 Dislocations: The Selected Innovative Poems of Paul Muldoon (2020) Liverpool University Press, Liverpool

Limited Editions and Booklets (poetry, prose, and translations)
 Knowing My Place (1971) Ulsterman Publications, Belfast
 Spirit of Dawn (1975) Ulsterman Publications, Belfast
 Names and Addresses (1978) Ulsterman Publications, Belfast
 Immram (1980) Gallery Press, Dublin
 The O-O's Party, New Year's Eve  (1980) Gallery Press, Dublin
 Out of Siberia (1982) Gallery Press, Dublin
 The Wishbone (1984) Gallery Press, Dublin
 The Astrakhan Cloak (By Nuala Ní Dhomhnaill in Irish. Trans Muldoon.) (1992) Gallery Press, Dublin
 Shining Brow (1993) Faber & Faber, London
 The Prince of the Quotidian (1994) Gallery Press, Dublin
 Incantata (1994) Graphic Studio, Dublin
 Six Honest Serving Men (1995) Gallery Press, Dublin
 Kerry Slides (1996) Gallery Press, Dublin
 The Last Thesaurus (1996) Faber & Faber, London
 The Noctuary of Narcissus Batt (1997) Faber & Faber, London
 The Birds (Adaptation after Aristophanes) (1999) Gallery Press, Dublin
 Hopewell Haiku (1997) Warwick Press, Easthampton, Massachusetts   
 The Bangle (Slight Return) (1998) Typography Press, Princeton, N.J.
 Bandanna (1999) Faber & Faber, London
 The End of the Poem: 'All Souls Night' by WB Yeats (lecture) (2000) Oxford University Press, Oxford
 Vera of Las Vegas (2001) Gallery Press, Dublin
 Unapproved Road (2002) Pied Oxen Press, Hopewell, N.J.
 Medley for Morin Khur (2005) Enitharmon Press, London
 Sixty Instant Messages to Tom Moore (2005) Modern Haiku Press, Lincoln, Illinois
 General Admission (2006) Gallery Press, Dublin
 I Might Make Out With You (2006) Lori Bookstein, New York
 The End of the Poem: Oxford Lectures (2006) Faber & Faber, London / Farrar, Straus & Giroux, New York
 The Fifty Minute Mermaid (By Nuala Ní Dhomhnaill in Irish. Trans Muldoon.) (2007) Gallery Press, Dublin
 When the Pie was Opened (2008) Sylph Editions, Lewes, East Sussex
 Plan B (2009) Enitharmon Press, London 
 Wayside Shrines (2009) Gallery Press, Dublin
 Feet of Clay (2011) Four Candles Press, Oxford
 Epithalamium (2011) Emanon Press, Princeton, NJ
 Songs and Sonnets (2012) Enitharmon Press, London 
 The Word on the Street (2013) Faber & Faber, London / Farrar, Straus & Giroux, New York
 At Sixes and Sevens (2013) Stoney Road Press, Dublin
 Encheiresin Naturae (2015) Nawakun Press, Santa Rosa, CA
 Rising to the Rising (2016) Gallery Press, Dublin
 I Gave The Pope A Rhino (2017) Fine Poetry Press, Manchester (Illustrated by Paul Wright, published by Andrew J Moorhouse, Fine Press Poetry, 2017)
 Superior Aloeswood (2017) Enitharmon Press, London 
 Lamentations (2017) Gallery Press, Dublin
 Sadie and the Sadists (2017) Eyewear Publishing, London
 The Dead, 1904 (2018) Gallery Press, Dublin
 Binge (2020) Lifeboat Press, Belfast
 Sure Thing (2022) Lifeboat Press, Belfast

Anthologies (edited)
 The Scrake of Dawn: Poems by Young People from Northern Ireland. Ed.(1979)
 Contemporary Irish Poetry : An Anthology. Ed. by Anthony Bradley (1980) 
 The Faber Book of Contemporary Irish Poetry. Ed. (1986)
 The Faber Book of Beasts. Ed. (1997)
 The Oxford and Cambridge May Anthologies 2000: Poetry. Ed. (2000)
 The Best American Poetry 2005. (Ed. with David Lehman) (2005)

Criticism, book reviews and other contributions 
 
 To Ireland, I (Clarendon Lectures of 1998) (2000) Oxford University Press, London
 The End of the Poem (Oxford Lectures) (2006) Faber & Faber, London / Farrar, Straus & Giroux, New York

Interviews, critical studies and reviews of Muldoon's work 
 Alonso, Alex, Paul Muldoon in America: Transatlantic Formations. Oxford: Oxford University Press, 2021. 
 Holdridge, Jeff. The Poetry of Paul Muldoon. Dublin: Liffey Press, 2009.
 
 Kendall, Tim. Paul Muldoon. Chester Springs, PA: Dufour Editions, 1996.
 Randolph, Jody Allen. "Paul Muldoon, December 2009." Close to the Next Moment. Manchester: Carcanet, 2010.
 Redmond, John. "Interview with Paul Muldoon." Thumbscrew 4 Spring 1996.
 Sherman, Susan. "Yusef Komunyakaa and Paul Muldoon [Interview]." Bomb 65 Fall 1998.
 Wills, Clair. Reading Paul Muldoon. Newcastle upon Tyne: Bloodaxe, 1997.

See also

List of Northern Irish writers
Oxford Professor of Poetry
Pulitzer Prize for Poetry
Postmodernism

References

External links

Paul Muldoon discusses poetry with Wunderkammer Magazine 17 January 2011 (Video, 20 mins)
Paul Muldoon reads "Wulf and Eadwacer" from The Word Exchange: Anglo-Saxon Poems in Translation (audio)
Paul Muldoon at the Key West Literary Seminar, 2010: "The Borderline" (Audio)
Poetry Foundation profile and poems Accessed 2010-02-27
Profile at Poets.org
Poetry Archive biography (U.K.) Accessed 2010-02-27
 The Guardian article – Extended interview with Muldoon and analysis The poet at play 12 May 2001 Accessed 2010-02-27
Poetry Society essays on Muldoon Accessed 2010-02-27
Transcript of interview with Ramona Koval, The Book Show, ABC Radio National, March 2008. Accessed 2010-02-27
Griffin Poetry Prize biography Accessed 2010-08-27
"Word Freak". Profile of Muldoon in The New York Times Magazine. Accessed 2010-02-27
Archival Material at 
Stuart A. Rose Manuscript, Archives, and Rare Book Library, Emory University: Paul Muldoon papers, 1939-2016

1951 births
Formalist poets
Irish poets
Living people
Male poets from Northern Ireland
Aosdána members
Alumni of Queen's University Belfast
Academics of the University of St Andrews
Academics of the University of East Anglia
Pulitzer Prize for Poetry winners
Princeton University faculty
People from County Armagh
People from Franklin Township, Somerset County, New Jersey
Fellows of Fitzwilliam College, Cambridge
Fellows of the Royal Society of Literature
People educated at St Patrick's Grammar School, Armagh
The New Yorker people
Oxford Professors of Poetry
Male writers from Northern Ireland
21st-century writers from Northern Ireland
T. S. Eliot Prize winners
Presidents of the Poetry Society
Members of the American Academy of Arts and Letters